SATS Security Services Pte Ltd (SSS) is a subsidiary of SATS Ltd, providing security services for aviation-related activities at Singapore Changi Airport. It provides armed auxiliary police officers for mainly airline clients as an auxiliary police force under the Police Force Act 2004.

SATS also provides aviation security to airlines at Changi Airport in Singapore especially those managed by it parent ground handler SATS Ltd., although they also provide security to SATS-related facilities.

History
In 1965, SATS Security Services originally started as the Malayan Airways Security Department. Its existence back then was to meet the security and aviation needs of its aircraft and to a certain extent, the Paya Lebar Airport. The MASD was restricted within the confines of Paya Lebar Airport and they do not have the powers of regular police officers.

SATS competed with the Changi International Airport Services when it was established in 1990.

When Malayan Airways was renamed to Malaysian Singapore Airlines (MSA), its Security Department was renamed MSA Police in 1967. In 1972, Singapore Airlines (SIA) came into being, after parting ways with MSA becoming Malaysia Airlines System. MSA police was renamed SIA Auxiliary Police.

A year later, SATS became a fully owned subsidiary of SIA and SIA Auxiliary Police became SATS Security Services, incorporating the former SIA Auxiliary Police Force in it.

In October 2018, SATS announced that all of its officers working at Changi Airport will be deployed with body cameras. At the same time, it was also announced that a total of SGD$1m (US$730,000) would be invested to digitize Changi's security systems to improve its services due to manpower problems.

In December 2021, SATS established its Outriders motorbike unit. 

For FY 2021-2022, SATS was granted a license to operate a training academy, being the third auxiliary police company to do so.

Deployments
Some current deployments of armed SATS Security personnel include:

 Singapore Changi Airport
 Resorts World Sentosa
 Marina Bay Cruise Centre Singapore

Company

Manpower
SATS Security had a manpower of 450 officers in 1989; SSS had 760 officers in 1999. By the 1999-2000 fiscal year, 805 officers are employed.

As of 2018, 800 officers are employed.

Training
SATS Security personnel who are eligible for further studies, are allowed to study for a diploma/specialist diploma in Aviation Management through SkillsFuture Work-Study Programmes.

Uniforms

Unlike Certis CISCO and AETOS auxiliary police, the uniform design of SATS Auxiliary Police closely resemble the Singapore Police Force (SPF); with the exception of the baby blue top and metallic cap and collar badges.

This is done to distinguish differences from uniforms worn by officers from the SPF.

Awards
SSS received the Outstanding Achievement in Collaboration in Education & Training award from the Australian Business/Higher Education RoundTable alongside Edith Cowan University for developing a Security and Police Studies Diploma Programme and scholarship funds for it.

Notes

References

Bibliography

External links
 SATS Official website

Auxiliary police forces in Singapore
Changi Airport
Business services companies established in 1965
Singaporean brands
1965 establishments in Singapore